Neoguraleus lyallensis is a species of sea snail, a marine gastropod mollusk in the family Mangeliidae.

Description
The length of the shell attains 13 mm, its diameter 5.5 mm.

The small shell is fusiform and rather solid. The sculpture consists of 11 to 12 low, strong, rounded, and slightly oblique axial ribs, rather wider than the interspaces, obsolete on the base and usually on approaching the outer lip. The spiral sculpture consists of minute striae, erased upon the ribs, a few at the anterior end stronger, and frequently several rough irregular ridges on the basal fascicle. The colour of the shell is light or dark brownish-red, or somewhat purple in somewhat beach-worn specimens. The spire is conical, with a lightly turriculated appearance, somewhat higher than the aperture. The protoconch is smooth, with a depressed nucleus. The shell contains 6 to 6½ whorls, moderately convex and lightly contracted at the base. The suture is somewhat deep and undulating. The aperture is narrowly rhomboidal, subchannelled above and terminates in a short, broad, and slightly twisted siphonal canal, not emarginate below. The outer lip is slightly thickened, flatly convex, and a little contracted towards the base, with a shallow rounded sinus below the suture. The columella is lightly curved, narrowed to a fine point at the left margin of the siphonal canal, and excavated on meeting the convex parietal wall. The inner lip rather is narrow, smooth, andnot very thick. The operculum is unknown.

Distribution
This marine species is endemic to New Zealand and occurs off  North Island, South Island and Stewart Island.

References

 R Murdoch, Additions to the marine Mollusca of New Zealand; Transactions and Proceedings of the New Zealand Institute XXXVII  1904 (1905), p. 221
 Powell, Arthur William Baden. The New Zealand Recent and Fossil Mollusca of the Family Turridae: With General Notes on Turrid Nomenclature and Systematics. No. 2. Unity Press limited, printers, 1942.
 Powell, A.W.B. 1979: New Zealand Mollusca: Marine, Land and Freshwater Shells, Collins, Auckland (p. 239)
 Spencer, H.G., Marshall, B.A. & Willan, R.C. (2009). Checklist of New Zealand living Mollusca. pp 196–219. in: Gordon, D.P. (ed.) New Zealand inventory of biodiversity. Volume one. Kingdom Animalia: Radiata, Lophotrochozoa, Deuterostomia. Canterbury University Press, Christchurch.

External links
  Tucker, J.K. 2004 Catalog of recent and fossil turrids (Mollusca: Gastropoda). Zootaxa 682:1-1295.
 New Zealand Mollusca: Neoguraleus lyallensis
 Spencer H.G., Willan R.C., Marshall B.A. & Murray T.J. (2011). Checklist of the Recent Mollusca Recorded from the New Zealand Exclusive Economic Zone
 Auckland Museum : Neoguraleus lyallensis

lyallensis
Gastropods described in 1905
Gastropods of New Zealand